EFQM (the European Foundation for Quality Management) is a non-profit membership foundation in Brussels, established in 1989 when the CEO/presidents of 67 European companies subscribed to the policy document and declared their commitments to EFQMs missions and values. EFQM works with over 50,000 organisations from across Europe and beyond, including organisations such as BMW, Robert Bosch, Aramco, Siemens and Huawei.

History 
The Foundation was set up with members from many industries to develop the EFQM Excellence Model. The framework was intended to be used to support the assessment of organisations in the European Quality Award in 1992.

On the 15th September 1988, 14 European business leaders met with the 8th President of the European Commission (1985-1995) Jacques Delors,  and signed a "Letter of Intent" to form a European Foundation. The 14 CEOs were:

Activities 
EFQM provides training services, award schemes by using their management framework, The EFQM Model.

The EFQM Model
The EFQM Model (known previously as the EFQM excellence Model) is a globally recognised management framework. The Model aims to support organisations in "managing change" and "improving performance."

A number of research studies have investigated the correlation between the adoption of holistic models such as The EFQM Model, and improved organizational results. The majority of such studies show a positive link. One tangentially related study was carried out by Vinod Singhal of the Georgia Institute of Technology and Kevin Hendricks of the College of William and Mary.

The EFQM Model, since 1989, aims to provide organisations from over 50,000 organisations with the skills to develop a culture of continuous improvement.

Application
The model is used by about 50,000 organisations across the world. In recent years, more countries have started implementing the Model, especially across the Middle East and South America.

The EFQM Global Award
The EFQM Global Award is run annually by EFQM.  It is designed to recognize organizations that have achieved an "outstanding level of continuous improvement", based on assessment against The EFQM Model.

See also
Total quality management

References

1988 establishments in Belgium
Non-profit organisations based in Belgium
Organizations established in 1988
Quality management